Fuller Seminary Northern California is one of Fuller Theological Seminary's seven regional campuses.  Fuller Seminary has two campuses where students can earn a degree – one in Menlo Park, which serves those living in the San Francisco Bay Area, East Bay, South Bay, and the other in Sacramento, which serves those living in the Greater Sacramento Area.  Fuller Seminary Northern California enrolls about 200 students in 70 or more courses.

Students can earn the Master of Arts in Theology, the Master of Arts in Theology and Ministry, Master of Arts in Intercultural Studies, and the Master of Arts in Christian Leadership degree entirely in Menlo Park or Sacramento. The Master of Divinity (M.Div.) degree can be earned entirely in Menlo Park, and partially in Sacramento, with students traveling to Menlo Park or another M.Div. degree site for twelve courses.

Fuller Seminary Northern California is accredited by the Association of Theological Schools and the Western Association of Schools and Colleges.

References

External links
Fuller Seminary Northern California

Evangelicalism in California
Seminaries and theological colleges in California
Universities and colleges in San Mateo County, California
Universities and colleges in Sacramento County, California
Menlo Park, California